Pierce Park School in Boise, Idaho, is a -story, flat roof, brick and stucco building constructed in 1911 as a 4-room schoolhouse. The building has expanded with its growing community, but the additions have been considered compatible with the original structure, and the school was added to the National Register of Historic Places in 1982.

The school was named for Pierce Park, a trolley park developed by Walter E. Pierce in 1907, four miles from Boise and along the route of the Boise & Interurban Railway. The park closed in 1928.

References

External links
 
 Pierce Park School website

National Register of Historic Places in Boise, Idaho
School buildings completed in 1911
School buildings on the National Register of Historic Places in Idaho
Schools in Ada County, Idaho
1911 establishments in Idaho